"Mississippi Girl" is a song recorded by American country music singer Faith Hill.  It was released in May 2005 as the lead single from her sixth studio album Fireflies.  A number one single on the Billboard Hot Country Songs charts in late 2005, it was her first number one on the country music charts since 2000's "The Way You Love Me".

Content
Written specifically for the Star, Mississippi-bred singer by John Rich (of Big & Rich) and fellow MuzikMafia member Adam Shoenfeld, the uptempo tune was anticipated within the industry and spearheaded Hill's post-Cry "country comeback" by insisting that she had not forgotten her roots:

 'Cause a Mississippi girl don't change her ways
 Just 'cause everybody knows her name.
 Ain't big-headed from a little bit of fame ...

The song also references Hill's forays into acting, in an episode of Touched By An Angel and the 2004 film The Stepford Wives.

"Mississippi Girl" was considered identical in purpose and theme to singer Jennifer Lopez' 2002 hit "Jenny from the Block", a fact noted by a number of commentators at the time.

Chart performance
The single debuted at #27 on the Billboard U.S. Hot Country Songs chart dated for May 28, 2005. It became Hill's first Number One on the country music charts since "The Way You Love Me" in 2000. "Mississippi Girl" peaked at No. 1 September 3, and stayed at No. 1 for two weeks. It also reached at peak of No. 29 on the Billboard Hot 100 and also became Hill's first single to chart the Billboard Pop 100, peaking at No. 29 there.

"Mississippi Girl" was nominated for the Grammy Award for Best Female Country Vocal Performance but did not win; however it did win the SESAC Country Song of the Year award for its two writers.

Slant Magazine said the song had the "stench of desperation" about it, with "southern-fried production [meant to] ape shamelessly the things that the women who supplanted her at the top of Nashville's pecking order have been doing."

Mississippi Girl was also the 500 millionth song download via the iTunes Store.

Music video
There is also a music video for the song, directed by Wayne Isham. In It, Hill and her band are seen performing the song in concert (filmed at a concert in July 2005 at Rupp Arena in Lexington, KY), intercut with shots of Hill walking around rural settings in a white dress as CGI butterflies flutter about. The video received a CMT Awards nomination.
At the beginning of the video, it shows Hill diving into the water from a wooden bridge in a long white dress.

Personnel
Compiled from liner notes.
 Bruce Bouton — steel guitar
 Bekka Bramlett — background vocals
 Tom Bukovac — electric guitar
 Paul Bushnell — bass guitar
 Perry Coleman — background vocals
 Eric Darken — percussion
 Dan Dugmore — steel guitar
 Dann Huff — electric guitar
 Tim Lauer — accordion
 Chris McHugh — drums
 Jimmy Nichols — keyboards
 Darrell Scott — mandolin

Chart performance

Weekly charts

Year-end charts

References

2005 singles
2005 songs
Faith Hill songs
Music videos directed by Wayne Isham
Songs written by John Rich
Song recordings produced by Byron Gallimore
Song recordings produced by Dann Huff
Warner Records Nashville singles
Songs about Mississippi